Digital Roses Don't Die is the fifth studio album by American rapper Big K.R.I.T., released February 18, 2022, by BMG Rights Management. The album release was paired with the Digital Roses Tour with ELHAE and Price, announced in February.

Reception

Year-end lists

Track listing

Personnel 
 Big K.R.I.T. – vocals
 Mike Hartnett – guitars (1-7, 10-12, 14-16), bass (3, 10)
 Jared Alexander Jackson – trumpet (3, 4, 7, 8, 10-12, 15, 17), bass (3, 5, 6, 9, 13, 15)
 Ashanti Floyd – strings (3, 6, 9, 11, 12, 15, 17), synth bass (3, 11), synthesizer (3, 15), bells (3), bass Moog (17), Mellotron (17)
 James Devon Brabham – keyboards (5-7, 11, 12), synth bass (7, 12, 15), bass Moog (4, 8), bells (12, 15), synthesizer (3), Rhodes piano (4)
 Andre Mo'Dre Brown – talk box (3)
 DJ Wally Sparks – scratching (7, 12)
 David Jackson – backing vocals (9)
 Adrian Crutchfield – flute (13, 17)
 Rolynné – vocals (15)
 John Horesco – engineering
 Marshall Helgesen – engineering
 Micah Wyatt – engineering
 Ralph Cacciurri – engineering

References 

2022 albums
Big K.R.I.T. albums
BMG Rights Management albums
Contemporary R&B albums by American artists
Funk albums by American artists